The British Open  is one of the longest-running darts events, having started just a few months after the first ever Winmau World Masters. The tournament used to be televised by the BBC from its inception, but it ceased to cover the event after 1983. It was often held between Christmas and New Year - the 1975 Championship was actually played in late 1974. The tradition was maintained until near the millennium, when the organisers moved the tournament back to September/October. In recent years the tournament has been televised on Eurosport along with several other BDO tournaments that were previously untelevised.

List of winners

Men's

Women's

Youth's

Tournament records
 Most wins 4:  Eric Bristow. 
 Most Finals 5:  Eric Bristow,  John Lowe.
 Most Semi Finals 6:  Eric Bristow,  John Lowe.
 Most Quarter Finals 11:  Martin Adams.
 Most Appearances 13:  Martin Adams.
 Most Prize Money won £13,500:  Eric Bristow.
 Best winning average (102.81) :  Martin Adams  v's  Mervyn King, 2004, Final .
 Youngest Winner age 20:   Eric Bristow. 
 Oldest Winner age 54: Ross Montgomery.

See also
List of BDO ranked tournaments
List of WDF tournaments

References

External links

British Darts Organisation tournaments
1975 establishments in the United Kingdom
Recurring sporting events established in 1975